St. Luke's Episcopal Church is a historic Episcopal church at Cannelton, Perry County, Indiana. Built about 1845–1846, it is a rectangular Greek Revival style frame building with a gable roof. It was lengthened by 17 feet in 1864, and features a three-story centered bell tower on the front facade.

It was listed on the National Register of Historic Places in 1983. It is located in the Cannelton Historic District.

References

External links
 St. Luke's Episcopal Church, Cannelton, diocesan profile

19th-century Episcopal church buildings
Episcopal church buildings in Indiana
Churches on the National Register of Historic Places in Indiana
Greek Revival church buildings in Indiana
Churches completed in 1846
Buildings and structures in Perry County, Indiana
National Register of Historic Places in Perry County, Indiana
Historic district contributing properties in Indiana